Jayden Gorman (born 25 January 2003), is an Australian professional footballer who plays as a forward for Perth Glory.

References

External links

2003 births
Living people
Australian soccer players
Association football forwards
Sorrento FC players
Perth SC players
Perth Glory FC players
National Premier Leagues players